Altstadtringtunnel is located in Maxvorstadt, Munich, Bavaria, Germany.

See also
Altstadtring

Buildings and structures in Munich
Transport in Munich
Maxvorstadt
Road tunnels in Germany

de:Altstadtring#Altstadtringtunnel